Devil's Bride is a Korean manhwa created by Se-Young Kim. The series was licensed in North America by Tokyopop.

Plot 
The plot revolves around Devil, who desperately tries to live a peaceful life as a human. Tired of loneliness, he decides to take a human bride and writes advertisements, saying that he will buy a woman for a huge reward. A young girl finally comes, forced to pay her father's debts, but eventually she appears to be a boy.

Characters 

 The Devil, who is willing to abandon his demonic nature.
 Ley, a child and a so-called bride, who turned out to be a boy.
 Prince Alex, a blind prince.

List of volumes

References

External links 
Devil's Bride at Tokyopop

Fantasy comics
Romance comics
Manhwa titles
Tokyopop titles
2007 comics debuts
LGBT-related comics
Transgender literature